St Swithun's School is an independent day, weekly and full-boarding school for girls in Winchester, Hampshire. It is named after Saint Swithun, a Bishop of Winchester and patron saint of Winchester Cathedral.

History
St Swithun's was founded as "Winchester High School" by Miss Anna Bramston, daughter of John Bramston, the then Dean of Winchester, with the ambition of educating "daughters of worthy citizens of Winchester". Not having sufficient money of her own, funds were raised by subscription. The school opened on 5 May 1884 with seventeen pupils. Pupil numbers soon grew and the school began taking in boarders as well.

In 1909 the school rented ten acres on Magdalen Hill for sports. The school's name was changed to Winchester Girls' School and then, after World War I, to St Swithun's School: the recorded virtues of this saint – Caritas, Humilitas, Sinceritas – were adopted as the school’s motto in 1928.

St Swithun's moved to its present location on Magdalen Hill Down on the edge of Winchester in 1931. Princess Mary the Princess Royal opened the new buildings formally in 1932, but the outbreak of World War II saw the school turned into a hospital and by 1942 St Swithun's became an American casualty clearing station. The school celebrated its 75th anniversary in 1959 with the Duke of Gloucester as a special guest.

Today, St Swithun's includes both junior and senior schools, meaning pupils can attend from nursery all the way to sixth form level. Boys may attend Nursery. A new junior school building was opened in September 2015 with a further sports hall opening in Easter 2016.

St Swithun's retains a strong Anglican tradition through its links with Winchester Cathedral. It holds five services there every year and the girls' choir sings at the cathedral.

Curriculum
St Swithun's has traditionally had a strong academic reputation. In 2011 GCSEs, it topped the results table for the city of Winchester with a 100% passing rate and all candidates achieving at least 5 A*-C grades, surpassing Winchester College. The same year, it broke its records in the A Levels with 11 girls scoring 3 or more A* grades. Since the year 2000 the school has had 100% pass rate in both GCSEs and A-Levels.

School Organisation

Junior School

The Early Years and Pre-Prep departments (nursery to Year 2) are coeducational. The prep department comprises Years 3 to 6 and girls are prepared for the Common Entrance Examination. The Junior School is a member of the Independent Association of Preparatory Schools.

Senior School
Year Groups
Lower 4 – Year 7
Upper 4 – Year 8
Lower 5 – Year 9
Middle 5 – Year 10
Upper 5 – Year 11
Lower Sixth – Year 12
Upper Sixth – Year 13

Houses
Each girl belongs to a house. Girls are assigned to either a boarding or day house except for those in Upper Sixth (Year 13), who belong to a single house. The house system is an integral part of school life as there are inter-house competitions in many co-curricular activities such as sports, public speaking and drama.

Boarding
St Swithun's school offers boarding facilities for girls of any age who enrol in the senior school. Just under half the girls in senior school are boarders and about 70% of them board only on weekdays.

Uniform

The school has a winter uniform consisting of a pale blue open necked shirt, orange-trimmed navy pullover and blazer, and a school kilt which is navy and orange or matching school trousers. In the summer girls can optionally wear a school dress. The sports uniform is a navy blue skirt and a light blue T-shirt with orange match shirts for lacrosse and netball.

Facilities
Sports facilities include 9 lacrosse pitches, 13 tennis courts (1 indoors), 6 netball courts, a 25-meter indoor swimming pool and a multi-purpose sports hall. In 2003, the PAC (Performing Arts Centre) – now "The Harvey Hall" – was opened, and it has a large auditorium to sit over 700, and also includes a Studio Theatre, Green Rooms, Box Office and a smaller SPS (Small Performance Space).

A new library was opened in 2007 by the Mayor of Winchester Chris Pines and The Very Rev James Atwell, Dean of Winchester.

In 2021, a new study centre, the Jill Isaac Study Centre, was opened for aspiring Oxbridge candidates.

Sports
St Swithun's has a strong sporting tradition and has enjoyed success at county level and inter-school competitions. The school was national lacrosse champion in 2008. Girls are encouraged to take up a sport and may choose from athletics, badminton, basketball, cricket, lacrosse and netball, Zumba, handball, trampolining, touch rugby, tennis, pilates and fitness.

Admissions

As for many other independent schools, candidates for entry to St Swithun's must sit the Common Entrance Examination.

Candidates for academic scholarships are selected based on the results of the Common Entrance examinations (11+ and 13+) and are invited to attend an interview soon after completion of the examination. Sixth form scholarship candidates (16+) are selected based solely on the results of academic assessments in the subjects that they intend to take at A level.

Music scholarships may be awarded each year to suitable applicants at 11+, 13+ and 16+. The minimum ABRSM standard required for music scholarships is Grade 5 at 11+, Grade 6 at 13+ and Grade 7 at 16+ on two instruments.

Girls can also apply for a sports scholarship, where they should be county level at two or more sports.

Former pupils
Alumnae are known as "Old Swithunites".

Sheila Scotter (1920–2012), Australian fashion designer
Mary Warnock (1924-2019), philosopher
Alex Mitchell, née Beale (1947–2010), editor of Christian magazine Third Way
Vivienne Parry (1956-), journalist and author
Arabella Pollen (1961-), fashion designer
Emma Chambers (1964–2018), actress 
Emma Walmsley (1969-), CEO, GlaxoSmithKline 
Fi Glover (1969-), BBC radio presenter
Lady Camilla Bloch (1970-), barrister
Gabriella Wilde (1989-), English model and actress
Zara Rutherford, (2002-), aviator

References

External links
School website
Profile on MyDaughter
2011 ISI Inspection Reports for the Junior and Senior School

Private schools in Hampshire
Schools in Winchester
Boarding schools in Hampshire
1884 establishments in England
Girls' schools in Hampshire
Member schools of the Girls' Schools Association
Educational institutions established in 1884